Majajani is the second album by Pakistani pop singer Abrar-ul-Haq. It was written, composed and sung by the artist himself. This album was a hit across Pakistan and to some extent in India. 

Among the album, the Billo on G.T. Road, Wan Kutia, and December were the biggest successes.

Track listing
Majajani
Billo On G.T.Road
Wan Kutia
Hello Hello
Dam Dam
Jhuly Lal
Ni Main Hasian
December
Sajni Ki Ankhon
Sahara

References

Abrar-ul-Haq albums